YI Sheng (born June 13, 1972 in Beijing, China) is an official of the Chinese Baseball Association who is most notable for coaching the China national baseball team in the World Baseball Classics in 2009, 2013 and 2017. He has also coached for the Beijing Tigers.  Furthermore, he has coached Team China in the 2002 Asia Games, 2005 Asian Baseball Championship, 2010 Asian Games and 2008 Olympics.

References

Living people
1972 births
Baseball coaches